Srđan Baljak (born 25 November 1978) is a Serbian former professional footballer who played as a striker.

Career
Born in Sremska Mitrovica, Baljak made his senior debut at Teleoptik, before being promoted to Partizan. He recorded one league appearance with the Crno-beli during the 1999–2000 season. Baljak also appeared as a substitute in a 0–1 away loss to Leeds United in the second leg of the 1999–2000 UEFA Cup first round. He was subsequently sent on a six-month loan to Radnički Kragujevac in the 2000 winter transfer window, but failed to make an impact.

In June 2002, Baljak moved abroad for the first time and signed with Japanese club Consadole Sapporo. He made 13 league appearances and scored three goals in the remainder of the 2002 campaign, but failed to help them avoid relegation from the top flight.

In the 2003 summer transfer window, Baljak returned to his homeland and rejoined Budućnost Banatski Dvor, after the club won promotion to the First League for the first time in its history. They eventually suffered relegation from the top flight in their debut season. Simultaneously, the club surprisingly reached the Serbia and Montenegro Cup final, thus securing a spot in the 2004–05 UEFA Cup.

While playing for Banat Zrenjanin, Baljak became the Serbian SuperLiga top scorer with 18 goals in the 2006–07 season, thus saving the club from relegation. He also helped the side reach the Serbian Cup semi-final that year, being eliminated by Vojvodina.

In June 2007, Baljak moved to Germany and signed with Mainz 05 on a three-year deal. He was their second-highest scorer in the 2008–09 2. Bundesliga with 11 goals, as they earned promotion to the Bundesliga. After making his debut in the top flight of German football, receiving limited playing time, Baljak was transferred to MSV Duisburg in January 2010. He was named the team's captain ahead of the 2010–11 campaign, leading the side to the DFB-Pokal final that season.

In July 2013, Baljak signed with Wormatia Worms on a free transfer. He left the club after only one season and joined Schott Mainz. In April 2017, it was revealed that Baljak would be retiring at the end of the season.

Statistics

Honours

Club
Budućnost Banatski Dvor
 Second League of Serbia and Montenegro: 2004–05
 Serbia and Montenegro Cup: Runner-up 2003–04
MSV Duisburg
 DFB-Pokal: Runner-up 2010–11
Schott Mainz
 Oberliga Rheinland-Pfalz/Saar: 2016–17

Individual
 Serbian SuperLiga Top Scorer: 2006–07

References

External links

 
 
 
 

1. FSV Mainz 05 players
2. Bundesliga players
Association football forwards
AZAL PFK players
Azerbaijan Premier League players
Bundesliga players
Expatriate footballers in Azerbaijan
Expatriate footballers in Germany
Expatriate footballers in Japan
First League of Serbia and Montenegro players
FK Banat Zrenjanin players
FK Budućnost Banatski Dvor players
FK Partizan players
FK Radnički 1923 players
FK Teleoptik players
Hokkaido Consadole Sapporo players
J1 League players
MSV Duisburg players
Sportspeople from Sremska Mitrovica
Regionalliga players
Serbia and Montenegro expatriate footballers
Serbia and Montenegro expatriate sportspeople in Azerbaijan
Serbia and Montenegro expatriate sportspeople in Japan
Serbia and Montenegro footballers
Serbian expatriate footballers
Serbian expatriate sportspeople in Germany
Serbian footballers
Serbian SuperLiga players
Wormatia Worms players
1978 births
Living people